Alipurduar Mahila Mahavidyalaya, established in 2007,  is the women's college in Alipurduar. It offers undergraduate courses in arts. The campus is in the Alipurduar district. It is affiliated to  University of North Bengal.

The college has two buildings and offers many skill development courses as well as livelihood training programmes. Innovative social contributions are being made by this college. Under the effort named WARMTH, they run a permanent clothes bank for needy people. They also hold cloth distribution camps in remote areas like forest villages. Another effort of them is PRAYAS. Under this activity they distribute books to school children.

Departments

Arts

Bengali 
English
History
Sanskrit
Political Science
Philosophy
Sociology
Education
Physical Education

Accreditation
The college is recognized by the University Grants Commission (UGC).
The college is NAAC accredited with CGPA 1.99 in their first cycle (2019 March).

See also

References

External links
 
University of North Bengal
University Grants Commission
National Assessment and Accreditation Council

Colleges affiliated to University of North Bengal
Educational institutions established in 2007
Universities and colleges in Alipurduar district
Women's universities and colleges in West Bengal
2007 establishments in West Bengal